Vijay Kumar Patodi (12 March 1945 – 21 December 1976) was an Indian mathematician who made fundamental contributions to differential geometry and topology.  He was the first mathematician to apply heat equation methods to the proof of the index theorem for elliptic operators. He was a professor at Tata Institute of Fundamental Research, Mumbai (Bombay).

Education
Patodi was a graduate of Government High School, Guna, Madhya Pradesh.  He received his bachelor's degree from Vikram University, Ujjain, his master's degree from the Benaras Hindu University, and his Ph.D. from the University of Bombay under the guidance of M. S. Narasimhan and S. Ramanan at the Tata Institute of Fundamental Research.

In the two papers based on his Ph.D. thesis, "Curvature and Eigenforms of the Laplace Operator" (Journal of Differential Geometry), and "An Analytical Proof of the Riemann-Roch-Hirzebruch Formula for Kaehler Manifolds" (also Journal of Differential Geometry), Patodi made his fundamental breakthroughs.

Research career
He was invited to spend 1971–1973 at the Institute for Advanced Study in Princeton, New Jersey, where he collaborated with Michael Atiyah, Isadore Singer, and Raoul Bott.  The joint work led to a series of papers, "Spectral Asymmetry and Riemannian Geometry" (Math. Proc. Cambridge. Phil. Soc.) with Atiyah and Singer, in which the η-invariant was defined.  This invariant was to play a major role in subsequent advances in the area in the 1980s.

Patodi was promoted to full professor at Tata Institute at age 30, however, he died at age 31, as a result of complications prior to surgery for a kidney transplant.

References

External links
 
 
 Concise Biography

20th-century Indian mathematicians
Differential geometers
Indian topologists
Tata Institute of Fundamental Research alumni
Institute for Advanced Study visiting scholars
Vikram University alumni
Banaras Hindu University alumni
University of Mumbai alumni
1945 births
1976 deaths
Scientists from Madhya Pradesh